Ashley Paris (born September 21, 1987) is an American basketball player. She is the twin sister of former WNBA center Courtney Paris, who last played for the Seattle Storm and is currently an assistant coach at the University of Oklahoma. She has been nationally recognized for her basketball achievements at the University of Oklahoma. She was selected on April 9, 2009 with 22nd overall pick in the 2009 WNBA Draft by the Los Angeles Sparks.

High school
Paris played for Modesto Christian High School in Modesto, California and then transferred to Piedmont High School in Piedmont, California, where she was named a WBCA All-American. She participated in the 2005 WBCA High School All-America Game, where she scored eight points.

College
On May 21, 2006, she was named a 2006 USA U20 National Team finalist. She chose the University of Oklahoma over such schools as Texas, UConn, Cal and Syracuse. Ashley and twin sister Courtney helped the Sooners go undefeated in the Big 12 during the 2005–2006 season, in which they went on to win the Big 12 Championship. In 2007 Ashley became a starter on the University of Oklahoma Women’s Basketball team along with sister Courtney. That year she received Big 12 Honorable Mention as well as making the All-Big 12 Academic First Team. She was a communications major and graduated in Spring 2009.

Oklahoma statistics
Source

WNBA

Paris was drafted in the WNBA Draft with the 22nd overall pick in the second round, 14 spots after her twin sister Courtney Paris. Paris was drafted by the Los Angeles Sparks. The Sparks announced that they decided to waive Paris on June 4, one day before the 11-man roster deadline on June 5. Although she was waived by the Sparks, she did manage to play in a preseason game. She wore the number 54 at the forward position. She scored 1 point which came at the free throw line. She played eight minutes for the Sparks in her only WNBA "game".  In March 2010 she was signed to a training camp contract by the Phoenix Mercury, and in March 2011 to a similar contract by the Atlanta Dream. On March 2, 2015 Paris signed a training camp contract by the San Antonio Stars.

Personal life
She is the twin sister of fellow WNBA player Courtney Paris. The twins are the daughters of Lynne Gray and former NFL player William "Bubba" Paris. She also has four brothers named Wayne, David, Austin, and Brandon and two half-brothers (Bubba's sons) William III and Christian.

References

External links
 USA Basketball Bio: Ashley Paris
Scout.com: All articles relevant to Ashley Paris
 Ashley Paris Sooner Player Profile

1987 births
Living people
American expatriate basketball people in China
American women's basketball players
Basketball players from San Jose, California
Los Angeles Sparks draft picks
McDonald's High School All-Americans
Oklahoma Sooners women's basketball players
Parade High School All-Americans (girls' basketball)
People from Piedmont, California
Power forwards (basketball)
Shandong Six Stars players
American twins
Twin sportspeople
Modesto Christian School alumni